23 Indian wrestlers  will be participating the 12th World Wrestling Championships (Combined) to be held in Las Vegas, Nevada, United States, from 7 to 15 September 2015. Both Indian wrestling legends Sushil Kumar earlier due to an injury and  wrestler Yogeshwar Dutt pulled out his name at the final moment.
In 2013 World Wrestling Championships, India won 1 silver and 2 bronze medals to secure 17th rank. Also the legendary Sushil Kumar could not make it to the tournament due to injury. 
In this event, Indian wrestlers failed to show their best performances, and ranked 24th in the medal list. However, in the Men's Freestyle category, they secured 10th position by winning the only bronze.

Medalists

Participants

Men's Freestyle

Women's Freestyle

Men's  Greco-Roman

References

External links
 Official Website

2015 World Wrestling Championships
2015 in Indian sport
Wrestling in India